The FAMAS Award for Best Picture is one of the FAMAS Awards, awards given to people working in the motion picture industry by the Filipino Academy of Movie Arts and Sciences Award, which are voted on by Palanca Award-winning writers and movie columnists, writers and people in the film industry (directors, actors, producers, technicians, crew etc.). The Best Picture FAMAS has always been considered the most important and top prize, and has been awarded by Filipino Academy of Movie Arts and Sciences ever since the very first ceremony in 1953. (Work in progress)

The FAMAS Award winner for Best Picture is usually the most prestigious selection of the best Filipino motion picture of the year. The FAMAS Best Pictures are held in high regard as the FAMAS is the equivalent of the Academy Awards in the Philippines.

Winners and nominees 
In the lists below, the winner of the award for each year is shown first, followed by the other nominees.

1950s

1960s

1970s

1980s

1990s

2000s

2010s

2020s

References

External links

Best Picture
Awards for best film